Encanto is a 2021 American computer-animated musical fantasy comedy film produced by Walt Disney Animation Studios and distributed by Walt Disney Studios Motion Pictures. The 60th film produced by the studio, it was directed by Jared Bush and Byron Howard, co-directed by Charise Castro Smith, and produced by Yvett Merino and Clark Spencer, with original songs by Lin-Manuel Miranda. The screenplay was written by Castro Smith and Bush, both of whom also conceived the film's story with Howard, Miranda, Jason Hand, and Nancy Kruse. The film stars the voices of Stephanie Beatriz, María Cecilia Botero, John Leguizamo, Mauro Castillo, Jessica Darrow, Angie Cepeda, Carolina Gaitán, Diane Guerrero, and Wilmer Valderrama. Encanto follows a multigenerational Colombian family, the Madrigals, led by a matriarch (Botero) whose children and grandchildren—except for Mirabel Madrigal (Beatriz)—receive magical gifts from a miracle that helps them serve the people in their rural community called the Encanto. When Mirabel learns that the family is losing their magic, she sets out to find out what is happening, and save her family and their magical house.

Encanto premiered at the El Capitan Theatre in Los Angeles on November 3, 2021, and was released in the United States on November 24 over a 30-day theatrical run. It was also released in 3D, 2D and D-BOX formats. It grossed over $256 million worldwide against a $120–150 million budget, and achieved wider commercial success when released onto Disney+ on December 24, 2021. The film received critical acclaim for its characterization, music, animation, voice acting, emotional depth, and cultural fidelity; reviews named magic realism and transgenerational trauma as the film's core concepts. Publications have described Encanto as a cultural phenomenon. The film was nominated for three awards at the 94th Academy Awards, winning Best Animated Feature, and received numerous other accolades.

The film's soundtrack also became a success, reaching number one on the US Billboard 200 and UK Compilation Albums charts; "We Don't Talk About Bruno" and "Surface Pressure" were its two most successful songs, with the former topping both the US Billboard Hot 100 and UK Singles Chart for multiple weeks.

Plot 
An armed conflict forces Alma and Pedro Madrigal, a young married couple, to flee their home village in Colombia with their infant triplets, Julieta, Pepa and Bruno. The attackers kill Pedro, but the candle of Alma magically repels the attackers and creates Casita, a sentient house for the family located in Encanto, a magical realm, bordered by high mountains.

Fifty years later, a new village thrives under the candle's protection, and its magic grants "gifts" to each Madrigal descendant at the age of five which they use to serve the villagers. However, Bruno, vilified and scapegoated for his gift of seeing the future, disappeared ten years earlier, while Julieta's youngest daughter, 15-year-old Mirabel, has mysteriously received no gift.

On the evening when Pepa's youngest son, 5-year-old Antonio gains the ability to communicate with animals, Mirabel suddenly sees Casita cracking and the candle's flame flickering, but her warnings go unheeded when Casita appears undamaged to the others. After overhearing Alma praying, Mirabel resolves to save the miracle's magic. The next day, she talks to her super-strong older sister Luisa, who confesses to feeling overwhelmed by her near-constant obligations then suggests that Bruno's room, in a forbidden tower in Casita, may explain the phenomenon.

There, Mirabel discovers a cave and barely escapes it with some pieces of a slab of opaque emerald glass in hand. Outside, Luisa discovers that her gift is weakening. After her family reminds her why Bruno is vilified, Mirabel reassembles the glass and sees a picture of herself with Casita cracking behind her.

Later that evening, Mirabel's oldest sister, Isabela, who can make plants and flowers grow at will, is scheduled to become engaged to neighbor Mariano Guzmán. Amidst Mariano's proposal and an awkward dinner, Pepa's daughter Dolores, who possesses superhuman hearing, reveals Mirabel's discovery to everyone, causing Casita to crack again, ruining the night and Mariano's proposal when the weather-controlling Pepa inadvertently conjures a downpour.

Amidst the chaos, Mirabel follows a group of rats and discovers a secret passage behind a portrait where she finds Bruno is hiding. Bruno reveals he never left the house, and that the vision changes between Mirabel saving and cracking the Casita, making him believe that she is the key to the Casita magic; refusing to let Mirabel get hurt, he broke the vision and disappeared. In Antonio's room, Bruno reluctantly conjures another vision that resembles the previous one, along with Mirabel embracing Isabela and strengthening the candle.

Mirabel reluctantly apologizes to Isabela, who abruptly confesses that she does not want to marry Mariano and is burdened by her image of perfection. Mirabel helps Isabela develop her powers and the two sisters embrace, but Alma spots the pair from the village square and rushes back to the house. Alma blames Mirabel of causing the family's misfortunes out of spite for not having a gift. Mirabel finally snaps at Alma for always seeing her as a disappointment and deeming no one good enough for her, even with their gifts. This argument creates a fissure that splits the nearby mountain and demolishes Casita as the candle extinguishes, leaving the Madrigals powerless. A heartbroken Mirabel runs away from the family, who scramble to find her.

Several hours later, Alma finds a tearful Mirabel back at the river where Pedro died and explains her tragic backstory and how, determined to preserve the magic, she ignored how her expectations were harming the family and finally accepts responsibility for what happened. Mirabel and Alma reconcile, and, with Bruno in tow, return to the village and assemble the Madrigals to rebuild Casita, with the townsfolk joining in. Mirabel installs a new doorknob to the main door, restoring the family's gifts and reviving Casita. She and Bruno join the family for another photo.

Voice cast 

 Stephanie Beatriz as Mirabel Madrigal: the 15-year-old protagonist who, unlike her family, does not have a special gift. Director Jared Bush described her as "imperfect and weird and quirky, but also deeply emotional and incredibly empathetic".
 Noemi Josefina Flores voices a 5-year-old Mirabel.
 María Cecilia Botero as Abuela Alma Madrigal: Mirabel's 75-year-old grandmother and the family matriarch. Her full name is not given in the film.
 Olga Merediz provides Alma's singing voice. Botero reprises her role in the Spanish dub of the film, while Yaneth Waldman provides her singing voice in said version.
 John Leguizamo as Bruno Madrigal: Mirabel's 50-year-old ostracized uncle who has the ability to see the future.
 Mauro Castillo as Félix Madrigal: Mirabel's uncle and Pepa's husband. Bush stated that Félix is "just there to have a good time!". Castillo reprises his role in the Spanish dub of the film.
 Jessica Darrow as Luisa Madrigal: Mirabel's second oldest sister, who is 19, has superhuman strength, and is the tallest of the family. Co-writer Charise Castro Smith described Luisa as someone who "[carries] all the burdens and never [complains]".
 Angie Cepeda as Julieta Madrigal: Mirabel's 50-year-old mother and Agustín's wife who can heal people with her cooking. Cepeda reprises her role in the Spanish and Italian dubs of the film.
 Carolina Gaitán as Pepa Madrigal: Mirabel's 50-year-old aunt and Félix's wife whose mood controls the weather. She often creates rain and storms due to her strong emotions. Gaitán reprises her role in the Spanish dub of the film.
 Diane Guerrero as Isabela Madrigal: Mirabel's oldest sister, who is 21 and can make flowers bloom anywhere. Director Byron Howard described her as "perfect" and "a success".
 Wilmer Valderrama as Agustín Madrigal: Mirabel's father and Julieta's husband, who Bush described as "accident-prone".
 Rhenzy Feliz as Camilo Madrigal: Pepa and Félix's 15-year-old son, Dolores and Antonio's brother, and Mirabel's cousin who can shapeshift. Castro Smith stated that Camilo is someone who "doesn't quite know who they are yet".
 Ravi Cabot-Conyers as Antonio Madrigal: Pepa and Félix's 5-year-old son, Dolores and Camilo's brother, and Mirabel's cousin who gained the ability to talk to and understand the animals. He looks up to Mirabel and considers her a big sister.
 Adassa as Dolores Madrigal: Pepa and Félix's 21-year-old daughter, Camilo and Antonio's sister, and Mirabel's cousin, who has super-hearing.
 Maluma as Mariano Guzman, Isabela's fiancé and the Madrigal family's neighbor. Maluma reprises his role in the Spanish dub of the film.

Additionally, Rose Portillo voices Señora Guzman, Mariano's mother and the Madrigal family's neighbor; Alyssa Bella Candiani, Noemi Josefina Flores, Paisley Herrera, Brooklyn Skylar Rodriguez, and Ezra Rudulph voice the town kids; Juan Castano voices Osvaldo, a donkey delivery man who Bruno predicted would grow a gut which came true; Sarah-Nicole Robles voices Señora Ozma, a townsperson who once asked Luisa to reroute the river; Hector Elias voices Old Arturo, a townsperson who asks Alma about their fellow townspeople becoming anxious about the fading magic; Alan Tudyk voices Pico, a toucan who Bush described as "clueless"; and Jorge E. Ruize Cano voices Tiple Maestro.

Production

Development 

During a November 2016 publicity tour for Moana, Miranda revealed that early-stage work had begun on an animated project that John Lasseter, then the chief creative officer of Disney Animation, had presented to him and Howard. Howard and Bush subsequently revealed that after finishing Zootopia (2016), they knew they wanted their next project to be a musical—which turned into a Latin-American musical after Miranda came on board. Howard and Bush had already worked on buddy films "where two characters go out into the world and learn about each other" and wanted to try something "completely different". The three men discussed their common experience of having large extended families, and decided to make a musical film about a large extended family with a dozen main characters.

During the five years it took to develop the film, Howard and Bush's "true north" was the theme of perspective, "about how you see the other people in your family and how you're seen". They began by brainstorming ideas on a whiteboard. Early on, they made "three important discoveries" about families which became the basis of the film's story: "1) most of us don't feel truly seen by our families, 2) most of us carry burdens we never let our families see, and 3) most of us are oblivious that nearly all of us, especially within our own families, feel the exact same way". In turn, it was Miranda who suggested that the "vibrant, broad spectrum" of Latin-American music could "best capture" the complexity of family relationships.

Early in development, the production team spoke with many therapists and psychologists. All were asked who would be treated best by the parents in a four-person family; every answer differed. Bush concluded: "It's about how you perceive yourself in the family." The crew also consulted family members and Disney Animation people.

Howard and Bush started to discuss Latin-American culture at length with Juan Rendon and Natalie Osma, who had previously worked with them on the making-of documentary Imagining Zootopia. Rendon and Osma both happened to be from Colombia and repeatedly drew upon their personal experiences with Colombian culture in their discussions, which caused Howard, Bush, and Miranda to focus their research on that country. Rendon and Osma became the first two of several cultural experts hired by Disney Animation as consultants on the film, who collectively formed what Disney called the "Colombian Cultural Trust".

In 2018, Rendon and Osma accompanied Howard, Bush, and Miranda on a research trip to Colombia. During their two weeks in the country, they met with architects, chefs, and artisans to immerse themselves in the country's culture. They also visited the Gabriel García Márquez foundation. They visited big cities like Bogotá and Cartagena, but they found inspiration in small towns such as Salento (terrain) and Barichara (architecture). Bush noticed that "every town we went to had a very specific personality", because of how the country's mountainous terrain divides and isolates them.

According to Disney fan club publication Disney twenty-three, this isolation became the key to placing the Madrigals' residence in a "remote 'encanto'—that is, a place that's 'charmed', or spiritually blessed, a domain where magic and reality merge". As Colombian tourist guide Alejandra Espinosa Uribe explained, Colombians are surrounded by "sacred lands that feel magical, and we coexist with them, not questioning their existence".

In Barichara, they befriended Espinosa Uribe, who showed them around the town, and later hired her to consult on the film's historical and cultural authenticity. Espinosa Uribe was an inspiration for several aspects of the film's protagonist Mirabel, including her curly black hair, large eyeglasses, and gestures. The design of Mirabel's skirt was inspired by traditional skirts woven in the Vélez area.

The final version of the film is deliberately vague as to the timeframe in which it is set, but drew inspiration from early 20th-century Colombia. After exploring the 1950s, the directors decided to shift the look of the film to the early 1900s and to use a "folkloric Colombian aesthetic". At the beginning of the 20th century, the country endured the Thousand Days' War, which resulted in the populations of entire villages fleeing to save themselves as depicted in the film.

Writing 
As the film steadily became more complex, with an entire family to develop, multiple songs, and a rich cultural setting with a deep tradition of magical realism, Howard and Bush realized they needed a second screenwriter to help write the screenplay. They selected Charise Castro Smith for her strong background in magical realism and experience with handling "real-world family dynamics". Bush described her as a "godsend", as she provided "a foundation of heart, vulnerability and authenticity". Castro Smith sought to create a distinct, imperfect, and completely human character in Mirabel, one that spoke to the lives of many Latinas while also being relatable to viewers globally.

From working on Moana, Miranda knew that film's protagonist, Moana, originally had eight brothers before they were removed to streamline the film's plot. As Miranda had expected from that experience, Disney Animation initially resisted moving forward with a dozen main characters for Encanto. Miranda deliberately wrote the film's opening number, "The Family Madrigal", to prove to Disney Animation that it was possible to efficiently introduce such a large family and its internal dynamics to the audience. Because of the film's 90-minute runtime, the filmmakers struggled to make the center family feel genuine, fleshed out, and human, and to give them arcs.

The crew worked hard to develop Encanto upon instantly identifiable family archetypes. The team focused on pushing past the archetypes and showing that family members are more complicated than the "masks" imposed on them. Each member of the Madrigal family is inspired by a common family archetype if it were exaggerated and made magical; for example, Isabela and Luisa are based on that of the golden child and rock, respectively. Bush explained that this method prevented each gift from feeling arbitrary, instead being prescribed by emotions and personality.

Like most Disney Animation films, Encanto went through "many different versions" in its development, as various story ideas were explored and discarded. The ideas discarded along the way include: a young modern-day woman is transported by a magical doorknob to another world; Agustín was the family patriarch who discovered Encanto and personally built Casita there; the film would have been expressly set in the 1950s and featured cosmopolitan and modern fashions, as well as motor vehicles and a trip to the big city where Alma had originally come from; Casita was an extension of only Alma's personality, rather than the entire family; the film would have followed the story of multiple generations and Casita over a 100-year timespan; Mirabel was desperately trying to find her magical gift, rather than merely expressing frustration with not being granted one; the colors of Mirabel's world as seen from her perspective would have reflected her emotional state as she narrated the first two acts, and then changed over to more realistic colors when the film shifted to Alma's point of view in the third act; Luisa's room would have been made out of stone and appeared "boring" to reflect her sense of responsibility, but would have concealed a "secret exit" to a hidden room similar to a "theme park" where she could have fun; and Isabela at one point had a "dorky" suitor named Bubo who came from the big city.

After the film's release, Bush revealed via Twitter several more ideas which had been discussed and set aside: Alma gave birth to the triplets at the river, at the moment of Pedro's death; Isabela and Mirabel's mutual hostility culminated in a fistfight; and Mirabel celebrated her quinceañera. According to Howard, as the plot evolved over several years, "the core of the whole film" was always the relationship between Mirabel and Alma.

Casting 
Disney cast several actors with Colombian heritage, including Stephanie Beatriz, whose father is Colombian; John Leguizamo, who was born in Bogotá; and Wilmer Valderrama, who spent his childhood in Colombia, where his mother is from.

Though no obvious roles which he could voice existed, due to the Madrigals' Colombian nationality and Mirabel's lack of an animal sidekick, Alan Tudyk—considered Disney's "good luck charm"—makes a cameo as Pico, a toucan. When he first came into the recording studio, Tudyk informed the crew that their scratch vocals for Pico were not actually those of toucans, but instead were parrots. He spent many hours doing imitations of various toucans. The team would speak to him in English, and Tudyk would respond using toucan noises.

Design 
Encanto was the "hardest film" to date for heads of animation Renato dos Anjos and Kira Lehtomaki because they were asked to fully develop a dozen characters, as opposed to other animated films which primarily feature two or three characters out of a large cast. Accordingly, the characters required a degree of complexity that Disney Animation had previously never achieved. Journalist Edna Liliana Valencia Murillo was the Afro-Caribbean consultant and contributed greatly towards Félix, Dolores, and Antonio's designs. According to Howard, certain characters' Afro–Latin hairstyles were essential. Neysa and Lorelay Bové, the costume design lead and associate production designer respectively, hoped to represent the film's various communities well. Neysa requested Colombian consultants, which included an anthropologist and botanist.

Instead of fabrics similar to neoprene that are often depicted in films, the characters' costumes are generally loose. The clothes are meant to appear as though they are from Colombia. The designers emphasized embroidery, texture, and movement; each costume—except Isabela's—is asymmetric, with a handmade feeling. In Encanto, personalities and family ties are represented through color. For example, Pepa and Félix's side of the family wear warm tones of orange, yellow, and red—an homage to his Caribbean ancestry.

By contrast, Julieta and Agustín's side wear cool tones of blues, purples, and greens. Alma "sits in the middle", with darker hues, such as purple, black, and brown. Each Madrigal has a symbol on their clothing that denotes their gift, such as barbells on Luisa's skirt and Pepa's sun earrings. Due to her lack of a gift, Mirabel has symbols of the other family members' gifts embroidered across her skirt, in addition to her face and name.

The residents of the Encanto dress in neutral tones; thus, the main family are distinguished by their vivid colors. They needed to be distinctive while not standing out, which visual development artist Jin Kim said occasionally made them harder to design than the main cast. Disney used simple silhouettes for the villagers' clothes to make them seem and feel similar to typical residents from the Colombian coffee region. They incorporated depictions of the Sombrero vueltiao from the Zenú Indigenous Community and the Sombrero Aguadeño from the Aguadas Community.

Animation 

The animators were challenged by the directors to make Mirabel distinctively different from all prior Disney heroines; she had to be both capable and imperfect, but not merely just clumsy. The Casita was inspired not only by traditional Colombian homes but films in which houses come alive, especially Beetlejuice (1988).

The production team learned in their research that music, dance, and rhythm are core elements of everyday life in Colombia. As a result, Encanto was the first Disney Animation film to have choreographers involved in the development process from start to finish, meaning they worked closely with the production team to develop songs, characters, and story.

This is in contrast to older films where the story was already in place by the time a choreographer was hired to consult on specific scenes. For Encanto, Disney Animation initially hired African-American choreographer Jamal Sims, who insisted on immediately hiring Colombian-American dancer Kai Martinez as the film's animation reference consultant. They worked together with a team of dancers to prepare choreography reference footage for each scene, and then gave feedback to the animators on scenes as they were animated. They developed different dance styles for different characters; Luisa's style is reggaeton, while Mirabel's style is Cali salsa.

For selection and animation of the plants and flowers that Isabela could make grow, the production team consulted with Colombian botanist Felipe Zapata. His advice allowed appropriate plants to be selected and then shown in accurate detail. The river of jacarandas and strangler figs and the cascade of sundew that Isabela produces are all based on this input. Plants in the background scenery are also realistic. These included the iconic, but now vulnerable wax palm and dramatic Cecropia trees. Economically important plants, like coffee, also appear.

Over 800 people, 108 of them animators, were involved in the production of Encanto. Disney Animation was planning to send many of its animators to Colombia starting on March 15, 2020, in preparation for the film's transition from development to production.  This second research trip had to be cancelled after the onset of the COVID-19 pandemic. The studio's animators ended up having to work remotely with the Colombian Cultural Trust; for example, Espinosa Uribe gave the animators a virtual tour of Colombia with the help of her cell phone. Diane Guerrero sent the studio's designers photographs of Colombian food taken by her relatives in Colombia.

On June 22, 2020, Miranda confirmed on Good Morning America that he and Bush were working on an animated Disney film set in Colombia, with Bush and Byron Howard directing, and Charise Castro Smith co-directing.

On June 18, 2020, the tentative title was revealed to be Encanto. The project was also confirmed to be the film Miranda was involved in, and it was reported to be about a girl in a magical family. On December 10, 2020, the project was officially confirmed at a Disney Investor Day meeting, where a clip was shown, a fall 2021 release was announced, and magical realism was referenced. According to Bush, development of the film's script wrapped in August 2021, and production on the film wrapped a month later. Due to the COVID-19 pandemic, many crew members worked together remotely for over a year and did not meet each other in person until Disney put on a socially-distanced outdoor screening of the final version of the film.

Cinematography 
Encanto is the first Disney Animation film since Tangled (2010) to employ a tall frame, a decision made to "get closer to the characters". This layout was supplemented by romanticism lighting. According to Howard, romantic (meaning heightened in spirit) is the film's key word in terms of the approach towards cinematography and lighting. The latter was also inspired by magic realism, due to the genre's heavy influence on the writing and characters.

The directors aimed to use the film's optics to portray strong emotions. Alessandro Jacomini and Daniel Rice—directors of cinematography, lighting—stated this use "would amplify, exaggerate, and distort perception, which is very in line with Mirabel's point of view as a narrator". Her feelings of being left out were also shown using emotive lighting. The directors frequently reminded the crew of the emotional subtext of every scene as well as the intricacies of the individual parts. That subtext was applied by Warner, Jacomini, and Rice in elaborate sequences, such as the song "Surface Pressure".

Soundtrack 

In June 2020, Miranda publicly revealed that he had begun to write the film's music, which would have eight original songs in both Spanish and English. After the film's premiere, he disclosed that he had been writing songs for the film from the very beginning. On September 8, 2021, Germaine Franco, co-composer of the songs for Coco (2017), began to score the film.

Encanto (Original Motion Picture Soundtrack) was released on November 19, 2021. A huge commercial success alike the film, the soundtrack reached number one on the US Billboard 200, becoming the first Disney soundtrack since that of Frozen II (2019) to top the chart. The track "We Don't Talk About Bruno" broke various records and became one of Disney's most successful songs of all time. It topped the US Billboard Hot 100 and the UK Singles Chart, and marked Disney's first number-one song on the former in the 21st century and its first-ever on the latter, making Encanto the first Disney film to produce a number-one song and a number-one album.

Release

Marketing 
The first look of the film was shown on December 10, 2020, during Disney's Investor Day. The teaser trailer was released on July 8, 2021, which garnered acclaim from internet users due to Luisa's physical appearance, especially her muscles; she was dubbed the "Buff Lady". The official trailer was released on September 29, 2021. For its opening weekend at the box office, Disney spent $14 million on television advertisements to promote the film, generating 1.26 billion impressions. Deadline Hollywood said the marketing failed to distinguish the film from other Disney properties, causing audience members to believe that it would be similar to Coco. :/Film was critical of Disney's merchandising, most of which featured Mirabel and Isabela. Many members of the Madrigal family could only be bought in more costly merchandise of the entire family. Since Isabela is considered the perfect and beautiful sister, the website stated the merchandise reinforces the idea that beauty is the most effective marketing tactic for young girls.

Theatrical 
Disney held the film's world premiere at the El Capitan Theatre in Los Angeles on November 3, 2021, and also held a Colombia premiere at the Teatro Colón in Bogotá, Colombia on November 23, 2021. The film was theatrically released in the United States on November 24. In response to the COVID-19 pandemic, it had an exclusive 30-day theatrical run before being released on Disney+ on December 24. The film was paired with the short film Far from the Tree. Encanto was released in China on January 7, 2022. On February 16, 2022, the film was re-released in cinemas after its success on Disney+ and Academy Award nominations.

Home media 
Encanto was released on Disney+ on December 24, 2021, and was released by Walt Disney Studios Home Entertainment on DVD, Blu-ray, and Ultra HD Blu-ray on February 8, 2022. Bonus features include "Let’s Talk About Bruno", "Our Casita", "Journey to Colombia", "Familia Lo Es Todo", "A Journey Through Music", and a sing-along version of the movie. The short film Far from the Tree was also released alongside the film on streaming and on physical media.

Since its Disney+ release, Encanto has consistently topped Nielsen's weekly streaming chart, most recently with 1.224 billion total minutes of viewing. Nielsen estimated that Encanto was the most-watched film of 2022 with 27.4 billion minutes viewed; approximately 269 million complete showings. It was more than double the second-place film on the end of year list Turning Red (11.43 billion minutes).

Reception

Box office 
Encanto grossed $96.1 million in the United States and Canada, and $160.4 million in other territories, for a worldwide total of $256.5 million. Encanto was 2021's highest grossing animated film before it was surpassed by Sing 2. Factoring in both the film's production budget and marketing expenses, along with the theaters' share of revenues, Encanto was estimated to need to gross at least $300 million worldwide to break-even. Nevertheless, the film went viral over the 2021 holiday season and achieved wider commercial success after its digital release to Disney+ on December 24, 2021.

In the United States and Canada, it was released alongside House of Gucci and Resident Evil: Welcome to Raccoon City, and originally projected to gross $35–40 million from 3,980 theaters in its five-day opening weekend. It opened nationwide on Wednesday, November 24, 2021 (the day before American Thanksgiving), and made $7.5 million on its first day, including $1.5 million from Tuesday night previews. It went on to make $40.6 million in its first five days. Of the 3.7 million moviegoers who saw it, 52% were Latino and Hispanic, 51% were families, and 62% were female. Though its five-day opening gross was lower than Pixar's The Good Dinosaur (2015) ($55.4 million), which failed at the box office in 2015, Encanto had the best opening weekend for an animated film during the COVID-19 pandemic.

In its second weekend, it made $13.1 million, less than the second weekend results of The Good Dinosaur ($15.3 million) and Tangled (2010) ($21.6 million) but higher than The Princess and the Frog (2009) ($12.1 million). It went on to finish in second place in its third and fourth weekends, earning $10 million and $6.5 million respectively. In its fifth weekend, it made $1.8 million and dropped to ninth place at the box office. In its sixth weekend, it finished in tenth place with $1.08 million. It dropped out of the box office top ten in its seventh weekend, finishing eleventh with $613,501.

Outside of the U.S. and Canada, it made $29.3 million from 47 markets in its opening weekend. The top countries in its first five days were France ($3.5 million), Colombia ($2.6 million), the United Kingdom ($2.4 million), Korea ($2.2 million) and Italy ($2.1 million). It earned $20.7 million in its second weekend and $13.6 million in its third. In its fourth weekend, it became Colombia's second highest-grossing animated film of all time. In its fifth weekend, it crossed the $100 million mark outside the U.S. and Canada. It earned $3.5 million in its sixth weekend, $5.8 million in its seventh, and $3.6 million in its eighth. As of January 9, 2022, its largest markets are France ($18.5 million), Colombia ($10.2 million), the U.K. ($8.8 million), Spain ($7.3 million), and Japan ($6.6 million).

Critical response 

Encanto was well received by critics. News channel CNBC reported reviewers considered it among Walt Disney Animation's best films. The website's consensus reads, "Encanto setting and cultural perspective are new for Disney, but the end result is the same – enchanting, beautifully animated fun for the whole family." Metacritic, which uses a weighted average, assigned the film a score of 75 out of 100 based on 41 critics, indicating generally favorable reviews Audiences polled by CinemaScore gave the film an average grade of "A" on an A+ to F scale, while those at PostTrak gave it an 88% positive score, with 70% saying they would definitely recommend it.

Animation and music 
The film's animation, which journalists considered beautiful, was a source of plaudits. RogerEbert.com critic Monica Castillo thought the musical sequences and characters' rooms allowed animation more artistic and abstract than that of previous Disney films. Writing for Good Morning America, Peter Travers deemed the visuals of Encanto miraculous, while Shreemayee Das of Firstpost described the animation as having spellbinding intricacy. Variety Owen Gleiberman gave acclaim, saying "Encanto has been visualized with a vivacious naturalistic glow (swirling flower petals, eye-candy pastels) that, at moments, is nearly psychedelic". David Rooney from The Hollywood Reporter highlighted the film's colors and the designs of the costumes, natural settings, and Casita for particular praise. For IndieWire, Kristen Lopez lauded the visuals as stunning and life-like. IGN Andrea Towers called the animation beautiful. The Daily Telegraph film critic Robbie Collin was particularly amazed: "Encanto animation is dazzling in all sorts of ways, with technical effects and flights of creative fancy that would have been unimaginable even a year ago, particularly during the musical numbers."

Critics found the film's songs "spellbinding". According to Ben Travis of Empire, the songs once again demonstrate Miranda's abundant skills for enchanting, wondrous melodies and lyrics. For Chicago Sun-Times and the Daily Herald, respectively, Richard Roeper and Dann Gire described the music as "infectious and instantly memorable", and "emotionally distilled [and] verbally nimble"; The Detroit News writer Adam Graham agreed, commenting that the songs "lift [Encanto] to the sky". Similarly, The Arizona Republic Bill Goodykoontz regarded them as the film's peak. CNN writer Brian Lowry shared a similar view. Nevertheless, many journalists found fault with the music, such as National Review Kyle Smith, who called it "thuddingly mediocre". Though he found the songs "breezy and fun", Christian Holub of Entertainment Weekly deemed them unmemorable. Writing for Bleeding Cool, Kaitlyn Booth believed the music was "[no]thing particularly special" and that a lack of songs would have benefited the film.

Representation and diversity 

Reviewers singled out Encanto representation and diversity for particular praise. Writing for The Guardian, Simran Hans found the awareness of culturally unique generational trauma and displacement intriguing and surprising. Despite being critical of a perceived disguise of cultural representation, Rafael Matomayor of The New York Observer stated that "when the film dives into the specificity of its portrayal of Colombia[,] ... it becomes an exciting, nuanced, complex magical realist adventure" that propels Disney into "a new era". The Independent Clarissa Loughgrey highlighted that the cultural specificity was more than simple aesthetic or linguistic references, commending the incorporation of magical realism and various skin tones. Whelan Barzel of Time Out summarized the film as a "genuine love letter to the diversity of Latin America".

Portrayal of family dynamics and emotion 
Reviews with regards to the film's portrayal of family dynamics deemed the aspect one of its strengths. According to Slant Magazine Derek Smith, Encanto thrives in expressing not only the typical message of the value of family but also the concept that even the best families require much effort to stay intact. Preston Barra of Denton Record-Chronicle named the message of family a contributing factor to the film becoming a "must-see family event"; fellow journalist Matt Goldberg, who writes for Collider, commended the message of "[being] enough because family is enough". Polygon Petrana Radulovic found the familial interactions stunningly realistic and strengthened by magical metaphors. Many critics also acclaimed Encanto emotional depth. The A.V. Club Caroline Siede lauded the depiction of intergenerational trauma. According to Screen International critic Tim Greierson, when the directors concentrate on the script's underlying emotions, the film is extremely moving. Writing for CinemaBlend, Dirk Libbey opined that every audience member would eventually cry once they discovered which character they identified with most. MovieWeb singled out Mirabel's search for acceptance and a purpose, stating "[b]uckets of tears are going to be shed".

Story 
Regarding "Disney's regular formula", Encanto divided reviewers; some thought that it departed from the formula well. Forbes Scott Mendelson called the film "terrifically unconventional", while World critic Collin Garbarino highlighted several aspects that he recognized as deviating from the formula; such as a lack of princesses and villains, as well as the focus on community. Vulture Bilge Ebiri attributed the film's enchanting qualities to the "smaller-scale narrative". He explained that when the Madrigals' inner journey is combined with the typical "Disney spectacle", it becomes an unexpected, "downright Sirkian power". Others found it too similar to other Disney films. For Pittsburgh Magazine, Sean Collier felt the film was "just another by-the-numbers Disney flick", while Peter Bradshaw from The Guardian thought that the story "wants to have its metaphorical cake and eat it", deeming it contrived. :/Film Josh Spiegel thought Encanto included a mixture of formulaic aspects from many of the previous Disney and Pixar films, and failed to make them unnoticeable.

Several critics found the story unfocused. The Irish Independent Paul Whittington considered the plot "too aimless, to satisfy anyone for long". Alice Forman of Mashable concurred and felt several parts of Mirabel's journey were arbitrary; she had a particularly negative opinion of the film's middle section, which she called tedious. The Globe and Mail writer Aparita Bhandari asserted the internal, rather than external, source of conflict and several unanswered questions confused her, preventing her from immersing herself in the film. From USA Today, Brian Truitt expressed his disappointment in the third act, which he said misses Encanto focal point. David Lynch, writing for KENS, agreed, and stated the act was weak due to an underdeveloped relationship between Mirabel and Alma, as well as clumsy writing. Multiple critics also cited the film's lack of villains as a detractor.

Rankings 
Metacritic reported that Encanto appeared in five critic top-ten lists, including CNN and New York Daily News non-ranked lists, and Pittsburgh Post-Gazette ranking (ninth). The film has also appeared on several lists of the best animated films of 2021, including those by Paste (tenth), Rotten Tomatoes (sixth), Screen Rant (non-ranked), MovieWeb (fifth), Vulture (non-ranked), and Comic Book Resources (sixth). Variety, IndieWire, Gold Derby, Entertainment Weekly, The Hollywood Reporter, Den of Geek, and the Los Angeles Times named the film the most-likely to win the Academy Award for Best Animated Feature, which was ultimately the case.

Impact and response 

The Denver Post journalist John Wenzel wrote, with Encanto alongside other 2021 films like West Side Story and Being the Ricardos, "Latino voices are having a moment in U.S. cinema, injecting a diverse set of cultures long ignored by TV, books, movies, video games, stage shows and news media." Pamila Avila, writing for USA Today, underscored that Encanto is Disney's first feature with an all-Latin American cast, capturing "the complicated tug and pull between older and younger generations in Hispanic families." Roughly 25% of viewership comes from Hispanic households, while 40% of viewers are between the ages of 2 and 11.

Billboard writer Leila Cobo said, following the success of Colombian musicians like Shakira, Maluma and J Balvin in the U.S., Colombia is "finally seen and not just heard" via Encanto. Cobo praised the film for not homogenizing all of the Latin American countries in the manner U.S. media has generally been, instead accurately depicting the culture unique to Colombia: "from accents to outfits to minute details like the hand-painted tableware, the embroidered dresses, the food, the many colors of our skin, even the animals – including the ubiquitous toucan and the yellow butterflies that are synonymous with García Márquez."

Johanna Ferreira of PopSugar wrote that the success of both Encanto and its soundtrack speaks to "not just the importance and significance of this type of representation in animated films, but also how movies like this are really changing how Latinx stories are being told." She stated Encanto celebrates the importance of family and respect for Latin American culture, featuring "animated stories about Latinxs written by Latinxs, with characters voiced by Latinxs, and a storyline that actually celebrates Latinxs communities rather than stereotype [Latinx]."

Mikael Wood of Los Angeles Times stated Encanto became "2022's first widespread cultural phenomenon", bolstered by its unique direction and music. Far Out journalist Tyler Posen called the effect "Encanto-mania". Various social media trends surrounding Encanto had "people posting videos of their children recognizing themselves for perhaps the first time in the movie's characters." Luisa's physical appearance has been praised for representing muscular women—a departure from Disney's conventionally "feminine" depiction of female protagonists as "small and skinny". As of January 23, 2022, the videos tagged with the hashtag "#encanto" have collectively amassed more than 11.5 billion views on TikTok. A viral meme in early 2022, "We Don't Talk About Apple Bottom Jeans", received over 31 million views in under three months, featuring a dubbed-over version of the song "We Don't Talk About Bruno" and inspiring other parodies of the song.

The film's characters and their dynamics have fueled a discourse among mental health specialists, many of whom reported that their clients, especially first-generation children of immigrants, "see themselves reflected" in the story of Encanto and use the film to communicate "about things that otherwise might go unsaid." Mirabel, Isabela, Luisa, Alma and Bruno have been the most discussed characters, with Bruno being associated with neurodivergent family members. Speaking to CNN, psychotherapist Kadesha Adelakun stated "there are so many layers" to Encanto, portraying issues "many families are going through."

Accolades 

At the 94th Academy Awards, Encanto received nominations for Best Original Score and Best Original Song, and won Best Animated Feature. The film won three awards at the 65th Annual Grammy Awards in the visual media categories: Best Score Soundtrack, Best Compilation Soundtrack, and Best Song ("We Don't Talk About Bruno"). Encanto other nominations include nine Annie Awards (winning three), a British Academy Film Award (which it won), two Critics' Choice Movie Awards, and three Golden Globe Awards (winning one). It also won the National Board of Review Award for Best Animated Film.

Future 
Jared Bush and Charise Castro Smith have expressed that they are open to a potential Disney+ series. Bush said he would be happy to see a show about any member of the family, and Castro Smith shared that Miranda was very interested in creating a show about Dolores. Disney CEO Bob Chapek described Encanto as the company's latest franchise during a February 2022 earnings call.

Notes

References

External links 
 
 

 
2020s American animated films
2020s English-language films
2020s musical comedy films
2021 comedy films
2021 computer-animated films
2021 fantasy films
2021 films
American animated comedy films
American animated fantasy films
American animated musical films
American computer-animated films
American fantasy comedy films
American musical comedy films
American musical fantasy films
Animated films about families
Animated films about magic
Best Animated Feature Academy Award winners
Best Animated Feature BAFTA winners
Best Animated Feature Film Golden Globe winners
Film and television memes
Films about dysfunctional families
Films directed by Byron Howard
Films impacted by the COVID-19 pandemic
Films produced by Clark Spencer
Films scored by Germaine Franco
Films set in Colombia
Films with screenplays by Jared Bush
IMAX films
Internet memes introduced in 2021
Magic realism films
Walt Disney Animation Studios films
Walt Disney Pictures animated films